The Seehore (also spelled Seehorn) is a mountain of the Bernese Alps, located east of Zweisimmen in the Bernese Oberland. It lies on the range between the Simmental and the Diemtigtal, north of the Spillgerte.

References

External links
 Seehore on Hikr

Mountains of the Alps
Mountains of Switzerland
Mountains of the canton of Bern
Two-thousanders of Switzerland